John W. Eckert (born March 13, 1939) is an American jazz trumpeter, known primarily as a big band sideman.

Early life and education 
Eckert was born in Leonia, New Jersey. He studied with Kenny Dorham in the late-1950s and graduated from the University of Rochester Eastman School of Music in 1961. He was a member of the Delta Upsilon fraternity. Following this, he entered a master's program at the University of North Texas.

Career 
In 1964, he began playing regularly in big band ensembles, working with Stan Kenton and Si Zentner; he played with Maynard Ferguson from 1966 to 1968. In the 1970s he worked with Loren Schoenberg and Lee Konitz, and in the 1980s with Gerry Mulligan, Grover Mitchell, Benny Carter, and the American Jazz Orchestra. He continued working with Mitchell and Carter into the 1990s, as well as with the legacy orchestras of Buck Clayton and Benny Goodman.

Discography

With Benny Carter
Central City Sketches (MusicMasters, 1987)
Harlem Renaissance (MusicMasters, 1992)
With Jimmy Heath
Little Man Big Band (Verve, 1992)
With Sam Jones
Something New (Interplay, 1979)
With Leon Thomas
Blues and the Soulful Truth (Flying Dutchman, 1972)

References

1939 births
Living people
American jazz trumpeters
American male trumpeters
Eastman School of Music alumni
Musicians from New Jersey
People from Leonia, New Jersey
University of North Texas College of Music alumni
21st-century trumpeters
21st-century American male musicians
American male jazz musicians
American Jazz Orchestra members